Strength Is in Unity or United National Movement – United Opposition "Strength Is in Unity"  is a political coalition in Georgia established before the 2018 presidential election and centered around the United National Movement. Originally set up to support the candidacy of presidential nominee Grigol Vashadze, it brought together ten political parties opposed to the ruling Georgian Dream party. It continued to operate after 2018, supporting local candidates and eventually fielding a joint electoral bloc during the 2020 parliamentary election.

After winning 36 seats in the 150-member Parliament of Georgia, SIU became the largest opposition group in the country but refused to recognize the election results after allegations of large-scale voter fraud surfaced. The boycott ended in May 2021 but caused several divisions within the coalition, resulting in the bloc receiving only 32 mandates. Since then, the MPs are united in the Strength Is in Unity parliamentary faction, originally chaired by Khatia Dekanoidze. The latter resigned in January 2023 after UNM floated the idea of renouncing its parliamentary mandates in exchange for the release of former President Mikheil Saakashvili by the Georgian authorities.

The parliamentary faction, which remains the only legal form of the coalition, is now led by acting chair Levan Bezhashvili. It has been in boycott since February 7 in protest of the Municipal Court of Tbilisi's decision to deny Saakashvili's transfer abroad for medical treatment.

History

Formation and 2018 presidential election 
The Strength Is in Unity coalition was formed on July 18, 2018 ahead of that year's presidential election with the goal of uniting the forces of small political parties opposed to the Georgian Dream-led government to back a single presidential candidate. The coalition at the time nominated Grigol Vashadze, a former Foreign Minister and chairman of the United National Movement (UNM), the largest opposition-leaning political party in Georgia affiliated with former President Mikheil Saakashvili. 

When the coalition was formed, Vashadze called it "the first step to achieving national consensus". In 2018, the coalition brought together ten parties, led by UNM, including For a New Georgia, Serve Georgia, the National Democratic Party (NDP), the Christian Conservative Party, the Civil Alliance for Freedom, New Georgia (NG), Georgia Among Leaders, and the European Democrats. UNM was the only one from the group to have elected leaders in Parliament, while media observers regularly called the other organizations "satellites" of UNM. Due to coalition being lesser known among the general public than its leading party, Vashadze was registered in the election as the United National Movement candidate. The coalition failed to bring on board other opposition parties, including the Labor Party, Democratic Movement-United Georgia, and Girchi, which all fielded their own presidential candidates. 

The group was considered to be a "big tent" organization, described by its leaders as "united behind one common goal, a strong and free Georgia". Grigol Vashadze, whose campaign was chaired by NG's Giorgi Vashadze, promised to reduce bureaucracy and took strong stance against the legalization of cannabis. He would later be endorsed by European Georgia and the Republican Party during the runoffs, although both parties refused to formally join the coalition at the time. Though Vashadze eventually lost the presidential race, the Strength Is in Unity coalition remained active as a platform to run candidates in further elections and in May 2019, nominated Sandra Roelofs (UNM) as a candidate for Mayor of the Zugdidi Municipality.

On December 22, 2019, the coalition's unity suffered its first setback with the departure of the New Rights Party, itself a post-electoral member, which merged with the new Lelo for Georgia political party.

2020 parliamentary election and boycott 

By 2020, the SIU coalition had been informally disbanded as political parties sought independent paths and electoral strategies. The 2019-2020 large-scale demonstrations, followed by the failure by Parliament to pass a compromise constitutional amendment on electoral reform in November 2019 and the March 8, 2020 agreement between Georgian Dream and the opposition each contributed to the creation of a negotiation format amongst opposition parties that set them apart, while leaving the smallest political parties in SIU with little to no funding, press coverage or membership. By the March 8 Agreement, five parties had remained in the coalition: UNM, New Georgia, Law and Justice (a scion of New Georgia), the European Democrats, and the Christian Conservative Party.

The coalition experienced its largest setback in July 2020 after the group rejected the prime ministerial candidacy of Giorgi Vashadze. The latter's New Georgia and Tamar Charkviani's Law and Justice both left to form their own electoral bloc, Strategy Aghmashenebeli. Democratic Movement-United Georgia, a party led by former Speaker Nino Burjanadze, agreed to not field any candidate against the SIU coalition, although it ran its own electoral list and refused to formally join the group. The National Democratic Party and CCP both fielded their own electoral lists, while also joining their forces with the coalition.

The SIU bloc continuously polled higher than any other opposition group and other parties sought a certain level of cooperation to avoid competition. In August, 30 political parties, including the SIU members, signed an agreement to field joint candidates in the various majoritarian districts of Tbilisi, although SIU would break the agreement by nominating Khatia Dekanoidze to run in the Isani Majoritarian District, where other parties had already nominated Giorgi Vashadze. Meanwhile, SIU's other nominees in Tbilisi (Nika Melia in Gldani and Levan Khabeishvili in Samgori) were endorsed by the 30-party group.

On 7 September, Strength Is in Unity nominated former President Mikheil Saakashvili as its nominee for Prime Minister of Georgia, a controversial choice for some as the UNM leader was at the time in exile in Ukraine and had been convicted in absentia by Georgian courts in 2018. Nonetheless, five political parties came together on 15 September and signed an agreement to formally recreate the SIU coalition: UNM, Progress and Freedom (PF), State for the People (SFP), and the Republican Party. The latter issued a statement explaining its decision to join the coalition by its goal of "defeating Bidzina Ivanishvili". The coalition's electoral list was led by singer Vakhtang Kikabidze and its top 30 candidates featured Grigol Vashadze, two nominees of the Republican Party, three nominees of State for the People, three nominees of Progress and Freedom, and Bachuki Kardava (chairman of the NDP). Out of 30 majoritarian districts, four SIU nominees were members of Progress and Freedom, while the other 26 were members of UNM.

The SIU won 27.1% in the parliamentary election, winning 36 seats in the national legislature and finishing second, behind Georgian Dream. In Adjara, it won 34% and was the only opposition group to win seats in the autonomous republic's legislature. However, SIU joined other political parties in refusing to recognize the electoral results after allegations of massive voter fraud surfaced, boycotting majoritarian runoffs and the seats they had won in Parliament and the Supreme Council of Adjara (both the Republican Party and SFP individually made similar declarations prior). However, one of its elected members in Adjara from the Republican Party broke the boycott and entered the Supreme Council on 25 December.

In the aftermath of the election and the ensuing political crisis, the SIU backed negotiations with Georgian Dream facilitated by Western powers, along with European Georgia, Lelo for Georgia, Strategy Aghmashenebeli, Girchi-More Freedom, and the Labor Party. While SIU MPs formally renounced their mandates, Parliament formally rejected their suspension on February 2, which allowed for negotiations to continue, although the crisis worsened when authorities arrested UNM Chairman and coalition de facto leader Nika Melia on 28 February. On March 1, 2021, EU Council President Charles Michel launched new negotiations between Georgian Dream and the opposition to put an end to the political crisis and SIU was represented in those talks by Salome Samadashvili and Akaki Minashvili of UNM and Khatuna Samnidze of the Republican Party. The sides reached an agreement on April 19, although SIU refused to sign the deal. This refusal proved to be controversial and led to the Republican Party leaving the coalition, along with Grigol Vashadze and Salome Samadashvili, who each signed the agreement independently.

Parliamentary faction 
On May 30, 2021, the coalition announced it would enter Parliament without signing the 19 April Agreement under the name of United National Movement - United Opposition "Strength Is in Unity" Faction, one of four parliamentary factions at the time. On June 7, the faction elected Khatia Dekanoidze (UNM) as its Chair and Levan Bezhashvili (UNM) and Nato Chkheidze (SFP) as its deputy chairpersons, with Giorgi Botkoveli (UNM) later becoming the third deputy chair. On the day the SIU faction joined Parliament, the Georgian Dream majority declared a recess to prevent a speech by UNM Chairman Nika Melia and to postpone voting on two bills opposed by the faction (one stripping public funding for boycotting parliamentary parties and one declaring an amnesty on both demonstrators and police officers involved in the dispersal of protests in 2019).

The faction started operating with 32 MPs, although five have left since then and one, Vakhtang Kikabidze, has died. Out of them, Nika Melia, Zaal Udumashvili, Nona Mamulashvili and Levan Varshalomidze, each members of UNM, resigned their seats from Parliament, while Dilar Khabuliani of Progress and Freedom left the faction to join Lelo for Georgia. The faction holds the vice-chairpersonship of the Culture Committee and the Finance and Budget Committee in Parliament.

On July 12, 2021, the SIU faction declared a partial parliamentary boycott following the death of a cameraman injured during the attack on the Tbilisi Pride by far-right groups, with faction leaders accusing the government of Prime Minister Irakli Gharibashvili of encouraging extremist groups on the eve of the protests. The faction announced at the time refusing to take part in parliamentary business except for votes on motions of no confidence and constitutional amendments. It put an end to the boycott six months later on January 22, 2022 to focus on establishing an investigative commission to study the treatment of Mikheil Saakashvili in prison, support an anti-corruption commission proposed by other opposition parties, and pass labor safety reform.

Since June 2022, the faction has presented a reform plan to address the 12 recommendations imposed by the European Commission as preconditions for Georgia's EU membership candidacy status. As part of the reforms, the faction has proposed a return to the 19 April Agreement, the creation of a National Anti-Corruption Agency, freeing Nika Gvaramia from prison, changing the election method of Central Election Commission leadership, and harmonizing media regulatory acts with EU directives. This plan has been endorsed by Strategy Aghmeshenebeli, Lelo for Georgia, and the Republican Party. It has also proposed a bill to allow the Constitutional Court to draft a list of so-called oligarchs to be banned from political interference.

The faction has continuously called for a moratorium on judicial appointments, electoral reform, and snap parliamentary elections. In November 2021 and December 2022, various members have declared hunger strikes in protest of the treatment of Mikheil Saakashvili in prison.

On January 30, 2023, faction member Levan Khabeishvili was elected chairman of the United National Movement, replacing former MP Nika Melia. Among his opponents was former MP Nona Mamulashvili, who campaigned on a platform to abolish the SIU Faction and boycott Parliament. A day later, Faction Chairwoman Khatia Dekanoidze announced her resignation after Khabeishvili suggested the party would resign its parliamentary seats in exchange for the Georgian authorities to let imprisoned former President Saakashvili be transferred abroad for medical treatment. She remains chair of the faction until a successor is selected.

On February 5, a UNM party congress appointed the 17 MPs from the party to ex-officio seats on the party's executive body, the Political Council. However, the move was criticized by several, including Khatia Dekanoidze and Ekaterine Kherkheulidze, as "undemocratic", several MPs not knowing about the decision until after it was approved. MP Akaki Minashvili stated he would refuse his seat on the Council. On February 7, the Faction announced a boycott of its parliamentary work to protest the refusal by the Georgian authorities to allow the transfer abroad of Mikheil Saakashvili for medical treatment. MP Roman Gotsiridze left UNM and the faction in response to the boycott.

Faction members

Former members 
When the Strength Is in Unity parliamentary faction was set up on May 31, 2021, it included 32 MPs. Since then, five members have left, either resigning from Parliament or leaving the faction to join another parliamentary group, and one has died:
 Nika Melia (left on October 5, 2021), resigned his parliamentary mandate;
 Dilar Khabuliani (left on December 14, 2021), joined the Lelo for Georgia parliamentary faction;
 Zaal Udumashvili (left on June 9, 2022), resigned his parliamentary mandate;
 Levan Varshalomidze (left on September 6, 2022), resigned his parliamentary mandate;
 Nona Mamulashvili (left on November 16, 2022), resigned her parliamentary mandate;
 Vakhtang Kikabidze, passed away on January 15, 2023;
 Roman Gotsiridze (left on February 17, 2023), became an independent MP.

Member Parties
 United National Movement
 National Democratic Party
 State for the People
 Progress and Freedom
 Victorious Georgia

Former Member Parties
Left after the 2018 presidential election
New Rights Party (party merged with Lelo for Georgia on 22 December 2019)
Serve Georgia
European Democrats
Civil Alliance for Freedom
Georgia Among Leaders
For a New Georgia

Left during the 2020 parliamentary election
New Georgia
Law and Justice
Christian Conservative Party

Left since 2020
Republican Party of Georgia

Electoral performance

Parliamentary

Presidential

References

2018 establishments in Georgia (country)
Centre-right parties in Georgia (country)
Political opposition organizations
Political parties established in 2018
Political party alliances in Georgia (country)
Pro-European political parties in Georgia (country)